Events from the year 1485 in Ireland.

Incumbent
Lord: Richard III (until 22 August), then Henry VII

Events
Ulick Fionn Burke, became 6th lord of Clanricarde (died 1509)

Births

Deaths
 Ulick Ruadh Burke, the 5th Clanricarde

References

 
1480s in Ireland
Ireland
Years of the 15th century in Ireland